The discography of British indie pop band Kero Kero Bonito consists of two studio albums, one mixtape, one compilation album, six extended plays, 36 singles, six remixes, and 18 music videos.

Albums

Studio albums

Mixtapes

Compilation albums

Extended plays

Singles

As lead artist

As featured artist

Guest appearances

Remixes

Music videos

Notes

References

Electronic music discographies
Pop music discographies
Discographies of British artists